John Maraganore is an American scientist, entrepreneur, and life sciences industry leader.

Education 
John was born in Chicago, Illinois, U.S. in 1962 to Greek immigrant parents. In 1984, he completed his B.A. from University of Chicago in Division of Biological Sciences. In 1985, he completed his M.S. from the University of Chicago in Department of Biochemistry and Molecular Biology. In 1986, Maraganore received his Ph.D. from the University of Chicago in Department of Biochemistry and Molecular Biology.

Career 
Maraganore started his career as a post-doctoral research scientist at Upjohn in Kalamazoo, Michigan, from 1985-86. From 1986-87, he was a senior scientist at Zymogenetics in Seattle, Washington. From 1987-1997, he was a senior scientist, group leader of thrombosis and hemostasis research, director of biological research, director of market and business development, and program executive at Biogen in Cambridge, Massachusetts. At Biogen, he invented bivalirudin, a direct-acting thrombin inhibitor, later commercialized in the U.S. as ANGIOMAXTM. In 1997, Maraganore joined Millennium Pharmaceuticals and was the general manager of their Biotherapeutics subsidiary till 1999. He then became vice-president of mergers, acquisitions, and strategic planning and led the acquisitions of Leukosite and Cor Therapeutics. In 2000, he was appointed senior vice-president of strategic product development.

For a nearly 20 years from 2002-2021, John served as the founding Chief Executive Officer and a member of the Board of Directors at Alnylam Pharmaceuticals. At Alnylam, he led the company’s pioneering efforts to advance RNA interference therapeutics from early research through global approval and commercialization of the first four RNAi therapeutic medicines: ONPATTRO, GIVLAARI, OXLUMO, and LEQVIO. The fifth RNAi therapeutic medicine, AMVUTTRA, was approved in 2021. At Alnylam, he forged over 25 major partnerships with leading pharmaceutical and biotechnology companies, raised over $7 billion to fund the company’s research, development, manufacturing, and commercialization activities, and built $25 billion in market capitalization value. He continues to serve on Alnylam’s Scientific Advisory Board.

Since his departure at Alnylam, John is the principal of JMM Innovation, LLC, committed to the advancement of transformative medicines to patients through investment and Board and strategic advisory services. He serves as a Venture Partner for Arch Ventures and Atlas Ventures, an Executive Partner for RTW Investments, a Senior Advisor for Blackstone Life Sciences, and an Advisor for M28. He is a Director of Agios Pharmaceuticals, Beam Therapeutics, Kymera Therapeutics, ProKidney Corp, and Takeda Pharmaceuticals. He is also on the Board of a number of privately held biotechnology companies including Aerium Therapeutics and Versanis Bio, and is Chair of the Boards of Aera Therapeutics, Aitia, Hemab Therapeutics and Orbital Therapeutics. He is a strategic advisor for a number of public and private biotechnology companies advancing biomedical innovation to patients.

Maraganore was the Chair of the Biotechnology Innovation Organization also known as BIO from 2017-2019, was appointed Chair Emeritus in 2022, and serves as a member of the BIO Board and its Executive Committee. In addition, he is a Director of the Termeer Foundation, which advances the legacy of the late Henri Termeer, on the Advisory Board of Ariadne Labs, which focuses on health system innovations, a Director of Nucleate, a student-led organization facilitating the formation of pioneering life sciences companies, and a Director of CHDI Foundation, committed to accelerating therapeutics for Huntington’s Disease. He is also Chair of the Advisory Board for n-Lorem, committed to advancing medicines for patients with nano-rare diseases, and a member of the MGH Research Institute Advisory Council.

Finally, Maraganore is an active mentor to emerging leaders across the biotechnology industry.

References 

Living people
American scientists
University of Chicago alumni
Year of birth missing (living people)